is a Japanese footballer who plays forward for Omiya Ardija in the J2 League.

Career
Tomiyama made his debut for Omiya Ardija in the J. League Division 1 on 2 March 2013 against Shimizu S-Pulse in which he came on as an 80th-minute substitute for Daigo Watanabe as Ardija lost the match 4–2. Tomiyama then scored his first goal of his career in the J. League on 16 March 2013 against Albirex Niigata in which he scored after 70 minutes to give Ardija the lead before Niigata scored the equalizer and the match finished 1–1.

Career statistics

Club
Updated to 23 February 2018.

References

External links 
Profile at Sagan Tosu
Profile at Omiya Ardija

 

1990 births
Living people
Waseda University alumni
Association football people from Tochigi Prefecture
Japanese footballers
J1 League players
J2 League players
Omiya Ardija players
Sagan Tosu players
Albirex Niigata players
Asian Games medalists in football
Footballers at the 2010 Asian Games
Association football forwards
Asian Games gold medalists for Japan
Medalists at the 2010 Asian Games
Universiade gold medalists for Japan
Universiade medalists in football
Medalists at the 2011 Summer Universiade